The Shuttlecock at the 2009 Southeast Asian Games was held from December 12 to December 16 at the Beung Kha Nong Sports Centre Gymnasium 1 in Vientiane, Laos.

Medal summary

Medalists

References

External links
 SEA Games 2009 Official Report

2009 Southeast Asian Games events